Phantom Halo is a 2014 American crime thriller drama film directed by Antonia Bogdanovich and starring Luke Kleintank, Thomas Brodie-Sangster, Sebastian Roché, Jordan Dunn, Tobin Bell and Rebecca Romijn.  It is Bogdanovich's directorial debut.  Her father, Peter Bogdanovich, served as an executive producer.

Cast
Luke Kleintank as Beckett Emerson
Thomas Brodie-Sangster as Samuel Emerson
Sebastian Roché as Warren Emerson
Jordan Dunn as Little Larry
Tobin Bell as Smashmouth
Rebecca Romijn as Ms. Rose
Gbenga Akinnagbe as Roman
Jeff Seymour as Adam
Clare Grant as Carlene

Reception
The film has an 8% rating on Rotten Tomatoes.  Dann Gire of the Daily Herald awarded the film two stars.  Oleg Ivanov of Slant Magazine awarded it half a star out of four.  Roger Moore of The Mercury News gave the film one and a half stars.  Oktay Ege Kozak of IndieWire graded the film a C−.  Tirdad Derakhshani of The Philadelphia Inquirer gave the film one and a half stars out of four.

References

External links
 
 

2014 films
American crime thriller films
American crime drama films
2014 directorial debut films
2010s English-language films
2010s American films